Shaolin Monastery or Shaolin Temple is a Buddhist monastery in Henan province, China.

Shaolin Temple or Shaolin Monastery may also refer to:
Southern Shaolin Monastery, Buddhist monastery in Fujian, China
Shaolin Temple (1982 film), a martial arts film starring Jet Li
Shaolin Temple (1976 film), a martial arts film by Chang Cheh
Shaolin Temple UK, martial arts school and centre for study of Shaolin culture in the United Kingdom

See also
Shaolin (disambiguation)
Xiaolin (disambiguation)

Buddhist temple disambiguation pages